Kamran Diba (born 5 March 1937) is an Iranian architect and museum director, and prior to the Iranian Revolution, Diba worked entirely in the public sector in Iran. He is currently residing in Paris, France.

Biography 
Kamran Diba was born 5 March 1937 in Tehran, Pahlavi Iran. He is cousin of Farah Pahlavi, the former queen of Iran. He studied architecture at Howard University, and graduated in 1964. He did a post-graduation year studying Sociology.

In 1966, he moved back to Tehran and joined DAZ Consulting Architects, Planners and Engineers. He is known for designing the new campus of Jondishapur University in Ahvaz, the Tehran Museum of Contemporary Art, and the Niavaran Cultural Center in Tehran. In 1986, Diba received the Aga Khan Award for Architecture for Shustar New Town in Khuzestan.

In 1967, Diba, Parviz Tanavoli, and Roxana Saba (daughter of Abolhasan Saba) founded the Rasht 29 Club on a northern street near the Amirkabir University of Technology (formerly the Tehran Polytechnic). Rasht 29 Club was named after the street address, and it was a popular hangout amongst artists of the time.

Diba served as the first Director of the Tehran Museum of Contemporary Art from 1976 until 1978.

In 1977, he was a visiting scholar at Cornell University. That same year in 1977, Diba left Iran and moved to Paris as well as spending time in Washington D.C.

Kamran Diba was also an artist, and hand a handful of painting exhibitions in Iran, although the number of works he created seems to be small. When he attended Howard University, he created art for Ulysses G. "Blackie" Auger, who was famous for his chain of restaurants and real estate fortune.

See also
Nader Ardalan

References

External links 
  Book Review: Four Thousand Days in Kamran Diba's Life, BBC Persian, April 2010

Iranian architects
Iranian emigrants to France
1937 births
Living people
Exiles of the Iranian Revolution in France
Howard University alumni